Sir George Robinson 5th Baronet (1730–1815), was a British landowner and politician who sat in the House of Commons from 1774 to 1780.
 
Robinson was the son of Sir John Robinson, 4th Baronet of Cranford and his wife Mary Morgan, daughter of John Morgan of Kingsthorpe, Northamptonshire and was baptized on 27 May 1730. He was educated at Oakham School and entered Trinity College, Cambridge in 1749. In 1755 he became a fellow. He married Dorothea Chester, daughter of John Chester of Covent Garden on 2 December 1764. In 1766-67 he was High Sheriff of Northamptonshire. He succeeded his father in the baronetcy on 31 August 1766.

Robinson had inherited  estates in Northamptonshire and in the 1774 general election he was returned as Member of Parliament for Northampton apparently on his own interest. He is not recorded as having spoken in the House. He did not stand again in 1780. A description was given of him as "an honest, independent country gentleman of Whig principles and inclined to Opposition".

Robinson died on 10 October 1815. He was succeeded by his son George.

References

1730 births
1815 deaths
18th-century British landowners
19th-century British landowners
People educated at Oakham School
Alumni of Trinity College, Cambridge
Members of the Parliament of Great Britain for English constituencies
British MPs 1774–1780
Robinson baronets, of London
High Sheriffs of Northamptonshire